This is a list of urban prefects or eparchs of Constantinople. The Prefect or Eparch (in ) was one of the oldest and longest-lived offices of the East Roman (Byzantine) Empire, being created in 359 and surviving relatively unaltered until the Fourth Crusade. The Eparch was one of the most important officials of the Empire, and exercised full control over all aspects of the administration of Constantinople, the Byzantine Empire's capital. In the Palaiologan period (1261–1453) the title was still awarded, but the office was replaced by several kephalatikeuontes (sing. kephalatikeuon, κεφαλατικεύων, "headsman"), who each oversaw a district, effectively a separate village within the now much less populous capital.

4th century

Proconsuls of Constantinople (until 359)

 Alexander (342)
 Ulpius Limenius (342)
 Donatius (c. 343)
 Montius Magnus (before 351)
 Strategius Musonianus (before 353)
 Anatolius (354)
 Iustinus (355)
 Photius (355/356)
 Araxius (356)
 Themistius (358–359)

Prefects of Constantinople (from 359)

 Honoratus (359–361)
 Domitius Modestus (362–363)
 Jovius (364)
 Caesarius (365)
 Phronimius (365–366)
 Clearchus (372–373; first term)
 Vindaonius Magnus (375–376)
 Restitutus (380)
 Pancratius (381–382)
 Sophronius (382?)
 Clearchus (382–384; second term)
 Themistius (384)
 Palladius (382/408)
 Theodorus (385/387)
 Nebridius (386)
 Clementinus (386/387)
 Proculus (388–392)
 Aristaenetus (392)
 Aurelianus (393–394)
 Honoratus (394?)
 Theodotus (395)
 Claudius (396)
 Africanus (396–397)
 Romulianus (398)
 Severinus (398–399)

5th century 

 Clearchus (400–402)
 Simplicius (403)
 Paianius (404)
 Studius (404)
 Optatus (404–405)
 Gemellus (404/408)
 Aemilianus (406)
 Monaxius (17 January 408 – 26 April 409)
 Anthemius Isidorus (4 September 410 – 20 October 412)
 Priscianus (413)
 Ursus (415–416)
 Aetius (419)
 Florentius (422)
 Severinus (423–424)
 Constantius (424–425)
 Theophilus (425–426)
 Cyrus of Panopolis (426)
 Neuthius
 Proculus (428)
 Heliodorus (432)
 Leontius (434–435)
 Cyrus of Panopolis (439–441)
 Iustinianus (474)
 Adamantius (474–479)

6th century

 Aristomachus (c. 583)

7th century 
 Kosmas (c. 608)

8th century 
 Daniel of Sinope (c. 713/4)
 Prokopios (766)

9th century 
 Marianos (c. 850)
 Niketas Ooryphas (860)
 Basil (862–866)
 Constantine Myares (866)
 Paul (c. 869)
 Constantine Kapnogenes (under Basil I)
 Marianos (under Leo VI)
 John (late 9th century)
 Philotheos under Leo VI
 Michael (turn of 9th/10th century)

10th century 
 Theophilos Erotikos (?–945)
 Constantine the protospatharios (945–?)
 Theodore Daphnopates

12th century
 Basil (c. 1106)
 John Taronites (c. 1107)
 John Taronites (c. 1147)
 Andronikos Kamateros (c. 1156)
 John Kamateros Doukas (c. 1181)
 Theodore Pantechnes (1181/2)
 Constantine Tornikes (c. 1198/1199)

13th century
Latin Occupation (1204–1261)
 Constantine Chadenos (under Michael VIII)

14th century
 Theodore Synadenos (1328–1330/31)

Notes

Sources 
 
 
 

 
Urban Prefects